Haroun Bouazzi is a Canadian politician, who was elected to the National Assembly of Quebec in the 2022 Quebec general election. He represents the riding of Maurice-Richard as a member of Québec solidaire.

Electoral record

References

21st-century Canadian politicians
Québec solidaire MNAs
Living people
Politicians from Montreal
1979 births